Nancy J. Tomes is an American historian, author, and Distinguished Professor at Stony Brook University. She was awarded the Bancroft Prize in 2017 for Remaking the American Patient: How Madison Avenue and Modern Medicine Turned Patients into Consumers and Arthur Viseltear Award from the American Public Health Association for her distinguished body of scholarship in the history of public health. Tomes attended Oberlin College from 1970 to 1972. In 1974 she received a B.A. in history from University of Kentucky, Summa cum Laude. In 1978 she received a Ph.D. in history from the University of Pennsylvania where she worked with Charles E. Rosenberg. In 2001 she received the Watson Davis and Helen Miles Davis Prize for The Gospel of Germs: Men, Women, and the Microbe in American Life. From 2012 to 2014 she served as the President of the American Association for the History of Medicine and currently gives lectures at the Messiah College.

References

Year of birth missing (living people)
Living people
21st-century American historians
Kentucky women historians
Oberlin College alumni
University of Kentucky alumni
University of Pennsylvania alumni
Messiah University
Stony Brook University faculty
American women historians
Bancroft Prize winners
21st-century American women